The EMD E6 was a , A1A-A1A, streamlined passenger train locomotive manufactured by Electro-Motive Corporation, and its corporate successor, General Motors Electro-Motive Division, of La Grange, Illinois. The cab version, E6A, was manufactured from November 1939 to September 1942; 91 were produced. The booster version, E6B, was manufactured from April 1940 to February 1942; 26 were produced. The  was achieved by putting two , 12-cylinder, model 567 engines in the engine compartment. Each engine drove its own electrical generator to power the traction motors. The E6 was the seventh model in a long line of passenger diesels of similar design known as EMD E-units.

Compared with passenger locomotives made later by EMD, the noses of the E3, E4, E5, and E6 cab units had pronounced slants when viewed from the side. Therefore, these four models have been nicknamed "slant nose" units. Later E models had the "bulldog nose" of the F series.

One interesting E6 variant custom-produced for the Missouri Pacific was the model EMC AA. The Chicago, Rock Island and Pacific owned an equally interesting pair of similar power cars known as the EMC AB6, which were mechanically identical but had boxcabs in blunt noses. These acted as boosters behind conventional E6A models on the Rocky Mountain Rocket train between Chicago and Limon, Colorado, from where the E6A would take the Denver cars north and the AB6 would take the Colorado Springs section of the train south.

Original owners

Surviving units
Three E6 locomotives survive today:

Atlantic Coast Line E3A 501 was wrecked before delivery, returned to EMC and rebuilt as an E6A. It has been preserved and now resides at the North Carolina Transportation Museum/Spencer Shops. ACL 501 has been at or near operational status for much of its life. After retirement from regular service, the unit was restored to purple & silver colors and run on Midwest fan trips by owner Glenn Monhart. After Mr. Monhart's death, the unit found a home in Spencer, North Carolina, at the North Carolina Transportation Museum. 

Chicago, Rock Island & Pacific Railroad E6A #630, was operated by the Midland Railway, in Baldwin City, Kansas. RI 630 has since been sold and will become part of a future museum in Manly, Iowa, along with Rock Island E8A 652. Both units have been cosmetically restored but currently are under a mechanical restoration at Mid-America Car in Kansas City, MO as of March 2017.

Louisville and Nashville E6A #770, built as L&N 450B, is located at the Kentucky Railway Museum, in New Haven, Kentucky. This unit is for display only, as it came to the museum  without most of its internal parts.

See also 

List of GM-EMD locomotives

References

External links

Kentucky Railway Museum motive power

Diesel-electric locomotives of the United States
A1A-A1A locomotives
E6
Passenger locomotives
Railway locomotives introduced in 1939
Locomotives with cabless variants
Standard gauge locomotives of the United States
Streamlined diesel locomotives